Hamburger Admiralitätsmusik (Hamburg Admiralty Music) TWV 24:1 is a secular oratorio for soloists, choir and orchestra composed by Georg Philipp Telemann to celebrate the 100th anniversary of Hamburg's admiralty. It was first performed on April 6, 1723, along with Telemann's Wassermusik (Hamburger Ebb' und Fluth)  at a banquet for the city's merchants, sea captains, and councillors that lasted until dawn. The work is on a nautical theme and set to verses by Michael Richey, a professor at the Johanneum school in Hamburg where Telemann also taught.

Structure

Overture in D major

Scoring
The Hamburger Admiralitätsmusik was composed for: 6 soloists SATBBB, 2 piccolos, recorder, 2 flutes, 2 oboes, oboe d'amore, 2 bassoons, 3 trumpets, 3 horns, drums, 2 violins, viola, cellos and basso continuo.

Roles: Hammonia (S), Themis (A), Mercurius (T), Neptunus (B), Mars (B), Albis (B)

Recording
Telemann: Hamburger Admiralitätsmusik; Overture in C (Mieke van der Sluis (soprano), Graham Pushee, Rufus Müller (tenor), Klaus Mertens, David Thomas, Michael Schopper (bass); Alsfelder Vokalensemble, Bremen Baroque Orchestra; conductor: Wolfgang Helbich). cpo 999 373-2.

References

Nicholas Anderson, Review of the CPO recording of Hamburger Admiralitätsmusik, BBC Music Magazine.
Stephen Rose, Program Notes, Academy of Ancient Music, April 28, 2007

Compositions by Georg Philipp Telemann
Music in Hamburg